The Lower Nyack Snowshoe Cabin, built in 1927 in Glacier National Park, is a significant resource both architecturally and historically as a shelter about one day's travel north of the Theodore Roosevelt Highway for patrolling backcountry rangers. The design originated at Yellowstone National Park, adapted in this case with a somewhat larger size.

See also
Upper Nyack Snowshoe Cabin

References

Park buildings and structures on the National Register of Historic Places in Montana
Residential buildings completed in 1927
Log cabins in the United States
National Register of Historic Places in Flathead County, Montana
Log buildings and structures on the National Register of Historic Places in Montana
1927 establishments in Montana
National Register of Historic Places in Glacier National Park
Rustic architecture in Montana